Eivind Kristofer Reiten (born 2 April 1953) is a Norwegian economist, corporate officer and politician for the Centre Party. He served as Minister of Fisheries from 1985-1986 and Minister of Petroleum and Energy from 1989-1990, before entering a career in business. Reiten served as the Director General (CEO) of Norsk Hydro between 2001 and 2009, after which he took up the chairmanship of Norske Skog. Eivind Reiten was also Chairman of StatoilHydro for four days until he resigned from his position after Norsk Hydro had been accused of corruption.

Political career
Reiten was born in Midsund as the son of Kristofer Reiten, a farmer and fisher, and housewife Kjellaug Opstad. He enrolled as a student in 1972, and graduated from the University of Oslo in 1978 with a degree in economics. He worked as a civil servant from 1979 to 1982, and as a secretary for the Centre Party from 1982 to 1983. He was then brought into the government as state secretary to the Minister of Finance from 1983 to 1985. He then became Minister of Fisheries from 1985 to 1986 as part of the Second cabinet Willoch, and Minister of Petroleum and Energy from 1989 to 1990 as part of Cabinet Syse.  In his last political position, he was responsible for the deregulation of the electricity market in Norway. Having chaired the Centre Youth, the youth wing of the Centre Party, from 1979 to 1981, he served as a deputy representative to the Norwegian Parliament from 1985 to 1989.

Business career
Reiten started working for Norsk Hydro in 1988, heading the energy division from that year, and becoming senior vice president of special projects in 1991. From 1992 he led the refining and marketing division, and from 1998 the aluminum division. He was appointed executive vice president for light metals in 1999. He succeeded Egil Myklebust as chief executive officer in 2001. He was a member of the board of the Bank of Norway from 1991 to 1994 and Norske Skogindustrier from 1997 to 2000, and has chaired the board of Norway Post (1996–1999) and Telenor (2000–2001). He has attended the Bilderberg meetings. He is a fellow of the Norwegian Academy of Technological Sciences.

Libya corruption case
As part of the merger between Statoil and the oil and gas division of Norsk Hydro, Reiten was appointed chair of the merged StatoilHydro that merged on 1 October 2007. Four days later Reiten withdrew from the seat. The reason was that it was uncertain whether or not he knew about a corruption case Hydro had been accused of, where a Libyan consulting company and the consultant Abdurrazag Gammudi had been paid , used to make bribes, after the Hydro take-over of Saga Petroleum in 1999. Stated Reiten, it was in no-one's interest that he retain a conflict of interest by retaining the seat of chair in the company that would investigate himself. The case had arisen on 26 September, after a Hydro employee had leaked information about the matter; it had not been identified as part of the due diligence performed by Statoil prior to the merger. He was replaced by his deputy, Marit Arnstad, who is also a former Minister of Petroleum and Energy from the Centre Party. The investigation from StatoilHydro concluded that Reiten was informed about this during 2000 and 2001, while the investigation in Norsk Hydro concluded that Reiten did not know about the corruption. Since the Norsk Hydro investigation—that included checking 1.5 million documents—could not show that Reiten knew about the corruption, Hydro Chairman Terje Vareberg confirmed that Reiten would not be removed from his position. However, two executives of StatoilHydro were required to leave immediately.

Leaving Norsk Hydro
In January 2009 Reiten announced that he was stepping down as Chief Executive of Norsk Hydro from 30 March 2009, with executive vice president Svein Richard Brandtzæg taking over. Reiten has since been nominated to replace Kim Wahl as Chairman of Norske Skog at the company's annual general meeting in April 2009.

Personal life
Reiten is married and has two children. He resides in Oslo.

References

1953 births
Living people
University of Oslo alumni
Norwegian businesspeople
Norsk Hydro people
People in the petroleum industry
Norske Skog people
Norwegian state secretaries
Government ministers of Norway
Petroleum and energy ministers of Norway
Centre Party (Norway) politicians
Deputy members of the Storting
Møre og Romsdal politicians
Members of the Norwegian Academy of Technological Sciences